Sugar Pine Dam is an earthfill embankment dam in Placer County, California, approximately  north of Foresthill. It impounds North Shirttail Creek, a tributary of the North Fork American River, and serves as the primary municipal water supply for the Foresthill community.

History
The dam was authorized in 1965 as part of the Auburn-Folsom South Unit of the Central Valley Project. Construction began in 1979, and the dam was completed in 1982. The project was transferred to the Foresthill Public Utility District for operation and maintenance in 1984. Although Sugar Pine Dam was funded through the Central Valley Project, it was never integrated into the project operationally, as it was intended to work with the never-completed Auburn Dam. The Sugar Pine Pipeline carries water from Sugar Pine Reservoir to the Foresthill area.

In 2003, the Foresthill Public Utility District purchased Sugar Pine Dam, reservoir, and the pipeline from the U.S. Bureau of Reclamation for $3.1 million. , the district provides water to 1,875 homes and 75 businesses in and around Foresthill.

See also
List of dams and reservoirs in California

References

Dams in California
Central Valley Project
Dams completed in 1982
1982 establishments in California
Earth-filled dams